Gina Bass (born 3 May 1995) is a Gambian athlete competing in sprinting events. She won the bronze medal in the 200 metres at the 2016 African Championships. Bass qualified for the 2016 Summer Olympics and was the Gambian flag bearer.

At the 2016 Summer Olympics, she placed 52nd in the 200 metres heats and did not qualify for the semifinals.

She is the first-ever Gambian qualifier for the final at the World Athletics Championships.

She currently holds national records in the 100 and 200 metres.

She qualified to represent Gambia at the 2020 Summer Olympics in the women's 100 metre and 200 metre events. In the 100 metres race, she set a new national record of 11.12 seconds.

International competitions

Personal bests
Outdoor
100 metres – 11.08 (+0.1 m/s St. PIerre 2022) NR
200 metres – 22.58(+1.8 m/s, Rabat 2019) NR

References

External links

1995 births
Living people
People from Fatick Region
Gambian female sprinters
Olympic athletes of the Gambia
Athletes (track and field) at the 2015 African Games
Athletes (track and field) at the 2019 African Games
Athletes (track and field) at the 2016 Summer Olympics
Athletes (track and field) at the 2018 Commonwealth Games
African Games medalists in athletics (track and field)
African Games gold medalists in athletics (track and field)
African Games silver medalists for the Gambia
Commonwealth Games competitors for the Gambia
Athletes (track and field) at the 2020 Summer Olympics
Olympic female sprinters
African Championships in Athletics winners
Islamic Solidarity Games medalists in athletics